Timothy DeCamp Wilson is an American social psychologist and writer. 

He is the Sherrell J. Aston Professor of Psychology at the University of Virginia and teaches public policy at the Frank Batten School of Leadership and Public Policy. He is known for his research on self-knowledge and the influence of the unconscious mind on decision-making, preferences and behavior. He is the author of two popular books on psychology, Strangers to Ourselves: Discovering the Adaptive Unconscious and Redirect: The Surprising New Science of Psychological Change.

Education 
Wilson received a Bachelor of Arts with a major in psychology from Hampshire College in 1973. He received a Master of Arts in 1975 and a Doctor of Philosophy in 1977, both in psychology from the University of Michigan.

Career 
Wilson is best known for his research on the adaptive unconscious, self-knowledge, and affective forecasting. With Richard Nisbett, Wilson authored one of psychology's most cited papers, "Telling more than we can know  verbal reports on mental processes," that demonstrated the difficulty humans have in introspecting on their own mental processes (Psychological Review, 1977, cited 2731 times as of May 22, 2007, according to ISI Web of Knowledge). His longtime collaborator is Daniel Gilbert of Harvard University.

Wilson has published two popular press books, Strangers to Ourselves and Redirect, and co-authored Social Psychology, an introductory textbook on social psychology. The textbook has been translated into Italian, Polish, Chinese, German, Russian, and Serbian; Strangers to Ourselves has been translated into Dutch and Japanese, with Chinese and German editions forthcoming.

Wilson received a Bachelor of Arts in psychology from Hampshire College in 1973 and a PhD in social psychology from the University of Michigan's Department of Psychology in 1977. From 1977 to 1979, he was a faculty member at Duke University. Since 1979, he has been a faculty member at the University of Virginia. His research has been supported by the National Institute of Mental Health, the National Science Foundation, and the Russell Sage Foundation.  In 2009, he was named as a fellow to the American Academy of Arts and Sciences.

His work has received numerous awards, including an All-University Outstanding Teaching Award from the University of Virginia in 2001, as well as the Thomas Jefferson Award for Excellence in Scholarship in 2015. In 2013, he was the recipient of the Society for Personality and Social Psychology's Donald T. Campbell Award, and in 2015 he was named a William James Fellow by the Association for Psychological Science.

He lives in Charlottesville, Virginia, with his wife, Deirdre Smith. He has two children, Christopher and Leigh.

Bibliography

Textbooks
Timothy D. Wilson also contributed as an author in co-writing Social Psychology (9th Edition)

Articles in journals

See also

Cognitive bias
Introspection illusion
Region-beta paradox

References

External links
University Webpage of Timothy Wilson
Timothy D. Wilson on Google Scholar

Living people
Year of birth missing (living people)
21st-century American psychologists
Social psychologists
Members of the United States National Academy of Sciences